Oren Eizenman (born March 27, 1985) is an Israeli-Canadian former professional ice hockey player. He last played for the Nippon Paper Cranes in the Asia League Ice Hockey (ALIH).

Biography
Eizenman was born in Toronto, Canada, to Ronit and Moshe Eizenman, and is Jewish. He spent some of his childhood living in a suburb of Tel Aviv. His father is a University of Toronto professor and an expert on eye tracking, and his mother is a teacher.  He is the brother of ice hockey players Alon (now a lawyer) and Erez Eizenman (now a management consultant), all three of whom have played for the Israeli national team.

Eizenman played hockey for the Wexford Raiders in the Ontario Provincial Junior Hockey League (OPJHL). He played two years on the varsity hockey team at Community Hebrew Academy of Toronto.

He played college hockey for RPI. As a freshman in 2003-04 he was seventh in the ECAC in freshmen scoring, was named to the ECAC Weekly Honor Roll twice, was ECAC Rookie of the Week once, and was named to the ECAC All-Rookie Team. In 2005-06 he was ECACHL Weekly Honor Roll four times, and ECACHL All-Academic. In 2006-07 he was ECACHL Weekly Honor Roll and ECACHL All-Academic.

Eizenman's professional career began with the Fresno Falcons.

Career statistics

Regular season and playoffs

International

Personal life

Eizenman was married to Jacqueline Frisch on June 26, 2016.

Awards and honours

See also
List of select Jewish ice hockey players

References

External links
 

1985 births
Canadian expatriate ice hockey players in the United States
Canadian ice hockey centres
Connecticut Whale (AHL) players
Elmira Jackals (ECHL) players
Fresno Falcons players
Haifa Hawks players
Hartford Wolf Pack players
High1 players
Israeli ice hockey centres
Israeli Jews
Jewish Canadian sportspeople
Jewish ice hockey players
Living people
Manitoba Moose players
Milwaukee Admirals players
Nippon Paper Cranes players
RPI Engineers men's ice hockey players
San Antonio Rampage players
Stockton Thunder players
Syracuse Crunch players
Worcester Sharks players
Israeli expatriate ice hockey people
Israeli expatriate sportspeople in the United States
Israeli expatriate sportspeople in Japan
Expatriate ice hockey players in Japan
Canadian expatriate ice hockey players in Japan